Weißer See (literally "White Lake") may refer to:

Weißer See (Potsdam)
Weißer See (Berlin)
Weißer See (Kargow)

See also
Weissensee (disambiguation) (Weißensee)
White Lake (disambiguation)